Heist-aan-Zee, Heist or Heyst, is a town (formerly a municipality, until 1971) in Knokke-Heist, West Flanders, Belgium.

It was a prominent summer beach resort in the 1890s.

It had a beach front lined with hotels and a "dike" paved walked way on a storm fender. Fishing boats were moored on the beach, and one could purchase a ticket to bathe in the sea.

External links

Heist-aan-Zee @ City Review

Former municipalities of West Flanders
Knokke-Heist